Fool's Paradise is a 1921 American silent romance film directed by Cecil B. DeMille. The film stars Dorothy Dalton and Conrad Nagel and was based on the short story "Laurels and the Lady" by Leonard Merrick. Prints of Fool's Paradise are preserved at the George Eastman House, the Library of Congress, and the UCLA Film and Television Archive.

Plot
As described in a film magazine, Arthur Phelps (Nagel) has been injured during World War I and while in a French had become dazzled by the beauty of French dancer Rosa Duchene (Harris). Back in the United States in an oil town along the Mexican boarder, Arthur meets American dancer Poll Patchouli (Dalton) in a Mexican cantina, and she falls in love with him. Rosa and her troupe are billed for a show in the local theater and while Arthur is waiting at the stage door to see his charmer, he lights a cigar that had been given to him by Poll. The cigar is of the trick kind, and the explosion that follows so injures Arthur's eyes that later while sitting in the theater watching the young French woman dance he becomes blind. Later Arthur wanders into the cantina while Poll is doing an impression of the French woman. Realizing that she has caused the blindness of the man she loves, Poll passes herself off as the French woman, imitating her voice and accent so perfectly that Arthur is deceived, and they are later married. They both live happily until Poll learns of the coming of a great eye specialist who could restore Arthur's sight. She takes him to the physician who restores his sight, and then Arthur leaves Poll and starts a search for Rosa. He finally tracks her down in Siam. After an incident there, Arthur realizes that it is Poll that he loves, and he returns to the Mexican boarder town in time to rescue Poll from the proprietor of the cantina, John Roderiguez (Kosloff). Arthur and Poll are remarried for the resulting happy ending.

Cast
 Dorothy Dalton as Poll Patchouli
 Conrad Nagel as Arthur Phelps
 Mildred Harris as Rosa Duchene
 Theodore Kosloff as John Roderiguez
 John Davidson as Prince Talaat-Ni
 Julia Faye as Samaran, His Chief Wife
 Clarence Burton as Manuel
 Guy Oliver as Briggs
 Jacqueline Logan as Girda
 Kamuela C. Searle as Kay
 Baby Peggy as Child (uncredited)
 William Boyd (uncredited)
 Gertrude Short as Child (uncredited)

Production notes
Production on the film began on April 4, 1921 and concluded on June 2, 1921. The film's budget was $291,367.56 and it went on to gross $901,937.79 at the box office.

See also
The Magnificent Lie (1931)

References

External links

1921 films
1920s romance films
American romance films
American silent feature films
American black-and-white films
Famous Players-Lasky films
Films based on short fiction
Films directed by Cecil B. DeMille
Paramount Pictures films
1920s American films